Dingsleben is a municipality in the district of Hildburghausen, in Thuringia, Germany.

References

Hildburghausen (district)
Duchy of Saxe-Meiningen